Calverley Bewicke (1755–1815) was a commander of the Durham Militia and an MP for Winchelsea from 1806 to 1816.

Life

He was born on 26 June 1755 one of twelve children of Sir Robert Bewicke of Close House and Urpeth, and his wife, Mary Huish daughter of Robert Huish.

He was educated at the Royal Grammar School, Newcastle upon Tyne. From 1773 he attended University College, Oxford.

In 1779 he rebuilt the family home of Close House following his marriage.

In 1782 he was appointed Sheriff of Northumberland. From 1794 to 1805 he was Lt Colonel of the Durham Militia.

He died on 24 October 1815. A memorial to Bewicke in Newcastle Cathedral was designed by Edward Hodges Baily.

Family

In 1777 he married Deborah Wilkinson, daughter of Thomas Wilkinson of Brancepeth. She died in July 1779 (probably in childbirth). In 1781 he then married Margaret Spearman (d.1859) daughter of Robert Spearman of Sedgefield.

His second wife was portrayed by Thomas Lawrence RA around 1785.

He was grandfather to Robert Calverley Bewicke (1819-1886).

References

Sources
entry on portrait of Bewicke's wife by Sir Thomas Lawrence

External links 
 

1755 births
1815 deaths
Place of birth missing
Members of the Parliament of the United Kingdom for English constituencies
UK MPs 1806–1807
UK MPs 1807–1812
UK MPs 1812–1818